Bama is the official state soil of Alabama.

The Professional Soil Classifiers Association of Alabama adopted a resolution at its 1996 annual meeting recommending the Bama Soil Series as the state soil. The association is of a group of soil classifiers representing the Alabama Cooperative Extension System, the Alabama Agricultural Experiment Station, the USDA-Natural Resources Conservation Service, the  Alabama A&M University, private soil consultants, the Board of Registration for Professional Soil Classifiers, and the Alabama Department of Public Health. The Alabama Soil and Water Conservation Committee and the Alabama Association of Conservation Districts also joined in recommending the Bama Soil Series as the official State Soil. The Bama series was designated the official state soil by the Alabama Legislature on April 22, 1997. 

Bama soils are mainly in level to gently sloping areas on high stream terraces paralleling major river systems and on broad marine terraces. These very deep, well-drained, moderately permeable soils formed in thick deposits of loamy fluvial or marine sediments. They occur in 26 counties. These soils are well suited to cultivated crops, pasture, hay, woodland, and most urban land uses. Cotton and corn are the main cultivated crops. 

Bama soils are classified in USDA soil taxonomy as fine-loamy, siliceous, subactive, thermic Typic Paleudults.

See also

List of U.S. state soils
Ultisols
Pedology (soil study)
Soil types

References 

Pedology
Soil in the United States
Geology of Alabama
Symbols of Alabama
Types of soil